Plagiognathus politus is a species of plant bug in the family Miridae. It is found in North America.

Subspecies
 Plagiognathus politus flaveolus Knight, 1923
 Plagiognathus politus politus Uhler, 1895

References

 Schuh, Randall T. (2001). "Revision of New World Plagiognathus Fieber, with comments on the Palearctic fauna and the description of a new genus (Heteroptera: Miridae: Phylinae)". Bulletin of the American Museum of Natural History, no. 266, 267.
 Thomas J. Henry, Richard C. Froeschner. (1988). Catalog of the Heteroptera, True Bugs of Canada and the Continental United States. Brill Academic Publishers.

Plagiognathus
Insects described in 1895